The Pokémon universe is a fictional universe that encompasses the Pokémon media franchise, including stories and fictional works produced by The Pokémon Company, Nintendo, Game Freak and Creatures, Inc. The concept of the Pokémon universe, in both the fictional works and the general nonfictional world of Pokémon, stems from the hobby of insect collecting, a popular pastime which Pokémon creator Satoshi Tajiri enjoyed as a child. Players of the video games are designated as Pokémon Trainers and the two general goals (in most Pokémon games) for such Trainers are: to complete the Pokédex by collecting all of the available Pokémon species found in the fictional region where that game takes place and to train a team of powerful Pokémon to compete against teams owned by other Trainers and eventually become the strongest Trainer: the Pokémon Champion. These themes of collecting, training and battling are present in almost every version of the Pokémon franchise, including the video game series, the anime series, the manga series, the film series and the Pokémon Trading Card Game.

Although Pokémon battles between Trainers is popular in the Pokémon universe, the series also emphasizes the harmony between people and Pokémon. Pokémon battles are treated like a competitive sport where both Pokémon and humans have fun. Pokémon rarely sustain fatal injuries during these battles and they also can obtain remedies for their ailments in a Pokémon Center, a specialized hospital for Pokémon.

Main series regions
There are several regions that have appeared in the various media of the Pokémon franchise. Each of the nine generations of the main series releases focus on a new region. Moreover, several regions have been introduced in spin-off games and two in the Pokémon anime, though most of these are still within the same fictional universe. Usually, the different regions are not accessible from one another via land (or at all within a single game). However, Kanto can be accessed from Johto and vice versa via the sea in Pokémon Gold, Silver, Crystal, HeartGold and SoulSilver versions.

Every region consists of several cities and towns that the player must explore in order to overcome many waiting challenges, such as Gyms, Contests, and villainous teams. At different locations within each region, the player can find different types of Pokémon, as well as helpful items and characters. Many regions are on separate continents with the earlier introduced regions (Kanto, Johto, Hoenn, and Sinnoh) being based on parts of Japan, with later regions being based on parts of the United States (Unova and Alola), France (Kalos), the United Kingdom (Galar), and the Iberian Peninsula (Paldea).

Kanto

The Kanto region is the setting of Pokémon Red, Blue, and Yellow and their remakes, Pokémon FireRed, LeafGreen, Let's Go, Pikachu! and Let's Go, Eevee!. Based on and named after the Kantō region of Japan, this setting started the precedent of basing the geography and culture of the game's region on a real world setting. This region is also visited in Pokémon Gold, Silver, Crystal, HeartGold and SoulSilver.

Sevii Islands

Johto

The Johto region is the setting of the second generation of Pokémon games, which includes Pokémon Gold, Silver, Crystal and their remakes, Pokémon HeartGold and SoulSilver. Again based on an area of Japan, this game's geography is based upon the Kansai, Tokai and eastern Shikoku areas of the country. The game setting draws upon the Kansai region's abundance of temples, the architectural design of the Kansai region and its geographical sights, such as Mount Fuji and the Naruto whirlpools.

Hoenn
 

The Hoenn region is the setting of the third generation of Pokémon games, Pokémon Ruby, Sapphire and Emerald, as well as their remakes Pokémon Omega Ruby and Alpha Sapphire. This time being based on the Japanese island of Kyushu; the real world and game region share an abundance of smaller islands around the main one and a subtropical climate. Like Sinnoh, this region is known to have a large range of various natural environments, such as rainforests and deserts.

Sinnoh

The Sinnoh region is the setting of the fourth generation of Pokémon games, which encompasses the setting of Pokémon Diamond, Pearl and Platinum, as well as their remakes Pokémon Brilliant Diamond and Shining Pearl and Pokémon Legends: Arceus.  It is based on the northernmost island of Japan, Hokkaidō. The region was meant to have a "northern" feel, with some routes being entirely covered in snow.

Battle Zone
The Battle Zone (Japanese: バトルゾーン Battle Zone) is a sub-region of Sinnoh located on a separate landmass northeast of the mainland.
Three settlements are located in the Battle Zone: the Fight Area, which holds the entrance to the Battle Tower in Pokémon Diamond and Pearl and the Battle Frontier in Pokémon Platinum; the Resort Area, where one can find the Ribbon Syndicate; and finally the Survival Area, home in Platinum to the Battleground and a Move Tutor's home.

Unova

The Unova region is the setting of the fifth generation of Pokémon games, which encompasses the setting of Pokémon Black and White and their sequels Pokémon Black 2 and White 2. For the first time in the main series, the region was based on a region outside Japan, with Unova taking inspiration from the New York metropolitan area.

Kalos

The Kalos region is the setting of the sixth generation of Pokémon games, which is where the games Pokémon X and Y take place. This region is inspired almost entirely by the northern half of Metropolitan France, with landmarks such as the Eiffel Tower and the Palace of Versailles having representations here, along with a French style of music and fashion. According to Junichi Masuda, the name "Kalos" comes from the Greek word . The Kalos Pokemon League is based on the Notre-Dame de Paris due to its castle/cathedral-like exterior.

Alola

The Alola region is the setting of the seventh generation of Pokémon games, Pokémon Sun, Moon, Ultra Sun and Ultra Moon. This region is based on Hawaii, marking the second time a main entry Pokémon game setting has been inspired by a U.S. state. The name itself is a play on aloha, the Hawaiian word for both "hello" and "goodbye".

Galar

The Galar region is the setting of the eighth generation of Pokémon games, which is where the games Pokémon Sword and Shield take place. This region is primarily inspired by Great Britain (mainly England and parts of Scotland), showcasing landmarks inspired by Big Ben and Hadrian's Wall. Two additional areas, The Isle of Armor and The Crown Tundra, are based on the Isle of Man and Scotland respectively. The Galar Region was also introduced in Pokémon Journeys.

Paldea 

The Paldea region is the setting of the ninth generation Pokémon games Pokémon Scarlet and Violet. The region seems to be based on the Iberian Peninsula, which encompasses both Spain and Portugal.

Spinoff regions

Pokémon Island

Fiore

The Fiore region is where the Nintendo DS spin-off game Pokémon Ranger takes place. Its name is Italian for "flower".

Almia

The Almia region is where the Nintendo DS spin-off game Pokémon Ranger: Shadows of Almia takes place. The region is similar to Fiore, in that Pokémon Rangers are present instead of Trainers. One of the features of the region is a school.

Oblivia
The Oblivia region is where the Nintendo DS spin-off game Pokémon Ranger: Guardian Signs takes place. This region is an archipelago composed of several islands located far to the south of both Fiore and Almia. It has many ruins and legends.

Orre

The Orre region is where the Nintendo GameCube spin-off games Pokémon Colosseum and Pokémon XD: Gale of Darkness take place. It is based on Arizona.

Trading Card Game Islands

The Trading Card Game Islands are where the Pokémon Trading Card Game and its sequel, Pokémon Card GB2: Great Rocket-Dan Sanjō! take place.

GR Island

Tumblecube Island
Tumblecube Island is an area exclusively explored in Pokémon Quest. All of the Pokémon in that game are in voxel/cube-like shapes, unlike the other games.

Holon
Holon is a region introduced and explored exclusively in the Pokémon Trading Card Game. It is a known habitat of the unusual δ Delta Species Pokémon, also introduced in the TCG.

Ransei

Ferrum

Pasio

Pasio is a region introduced in the mobile gacha game "Pokémon Masters EX," which was originally called "Pokémon Masters". It is an artificial island made by the soon-to-be King of Pasio, Lear. This region, being man-made, does not have any natural wild Pokémon. Hoopa is thought to have brought some of the citizens there, which include Gym Leaders, Elite Four Members, and even Champions from the eight main regions of the franchise.

Aeos Island 

Aeos is an island introduced in the MOBA game Pokémon Unite. A mysterious energy known as Aeos energy permeates the island, making Pokémon stronger and giving them enhanced abilities. Trainers from around the world come here to compete in Unite Battles and to harness Aeos energy.

In-universe chronology

According to dialogue in Pokémon Diamond and Pearl, Platinum, and Legends: Arceus, the in-game lore suggest that the Pokémon universe was created by a creator deity and Pokémon Arceus, a creature described as "The Original One". Several other Pokémon were made by Arceus: Dialga, the embodiment of time, Palkia, the embodiment of space, and Giratina, the embodiment of antimatter, who was banished to another dimension. Arceus then created Azelf, Mesprit and Uxie; the spirits of willpower, emotion and knowledge respectively. At this early time, Mew, the ancestor of Pokémon, appeared in the universe. After creating the Pokémon world, Arceus went into an eternal sleep.

After Arceus' creation, Groudon, embodiment of the land; Kyogre, embodiment of the sea; and Rayquaza, embodiment of the sky; were born. They are sometimes unofficially known as "the weather trio", as each of these Pokémon possess weather-changing abilities. The clash of these three Pokémon was said to have created much of the Earth's surface. Mt. Coronet was created at this point of time as Regigigas moved landmass to form continents and regions. Stark Mountain and Heatran were also created at this time.

Many years after, the prehistoric era began and the first prehistoric Pokémon came into being. The games state that scientists proved that prehistoric Pokémon roamed the land, as Fossils and other paleontological remains have been found to contain the DNA of Pokémon. The Mew population on the planet may have decreased at this stage, as they slowly gave way to other Pokémon species.

Evolution 
According to the in-game myths of Sinnoh, Pokémon and people were originally the same species. Mew is the ancestor of all Pokémon, and the first human recording was in the Stone Age, millions of years before the modern era.

Works

Video game series
Pokémon video game series
List of Pokémon video games

Animated series and films
Pokémon television series
Pokémon film series

Card game and board game
Pokémon Trading Card Game
List of Pokémon Trading Card Game sets
Pokémon Trading Figure Game

Books and manga
List of Pokémon books
Pokémon manga
Pokémon Adventures

Detective Pikachu game and film
Detective Pikachu (video game)
Detective Pikachu (live-action film)

References

Universe
Fictional elements introduced in 1996
Video game locations
Fictional universes